Delta Blues (デルタブルース, born 3 May 2001) is a Japanese Thoroughbred racehorse best known for winning the 2006 Melbourne Cup. He was the first Japanese horse to win the Cup. In doing so he defeated Pop Rock, another Japanese horse, also trained by Katsuhiko Sumii.

Racing career 
Delta Blues was virtually unknown until he had his victory in the 2004 Kikuka Sho. He defeated Heart's Cry and Cosmo Bulk then. Delta Blues placed third in the Japan Cup in November 2004.

Other runs by Delta Blues include wins in the Domestic Grade One Kikuka Sho (Japanese St Leger) in October 2004, the Domestic Grade Two Stayers Stakes in December 2005, a third in the Grade Two Hanshin Daishoten on 19 March 2006 fifth in the Arima Kinen, and 10th in the Domestic Grade One Tenno Sho (Spring) on 30 April 30.

Delta Blues won the Best Horse by Home-Bred Sire JRA award in 2004.

2006 in Australia 
Taken to Australia, Delta Blues finished third in the 2006 Caulfield Cup after racing wide throughout the race.

In the 2006 Melbourne Cup, Delta Blues was ridden by Japanese jockey Yasunari Iwata who was the winner of the 2005 19th World Super Jockey Series. Delta Blues won the Melbourne Cup by a nose ahead of Pop Rock, with Maybe Better finishing in third place. Prior to the race, stable spokesman Keita Tanaka characterised Delta Blues as a "lazy horse", and trainer Sumii characterised him as "tough".

Achievements 
 Winner of the 2004 Kikuka Sho (JPN Domestic GI, Japanese St. Leger)
 Winner of the 2004 Best Horse by Home-Bred Sire JRA award.
 Winner of the 2006 Melbourne Cup
 Winner of the 2006–2007 Australian Champion Stayer

Breeding 
Delta Blues was sired by Dance in the Dark with the dam Dixie Splash (sire Dixieland Band). The breeder was Northern Farm.

Namesake
Australian rail operator CFCL Australia named locomotive CF4401 after the horse.

See also 
 List of millionaire racehorses in Australia
 List of Melbourne Cup winners

References

External links 

 ABC News - Photo gallery of Delta Blues winning the 2006 Melbourne Cup

2001 racehorse births
Racehorses bred in Japan
Racehorses trained in Japan
Melbourne Cup winners
Thoroughbred family 3-d